Dreamin' is the debut EP from Australian surf rock duo Hockey Dad. The EP was released in June 2014 by Farmer & The Owl.

Background 
Hockey Dad was formed in 2013 by friends Zach Stephenson and William Fleming. Their first live performance was at Rad Bar, a small music venue in Wollongong, where the two worked part-time.

Dreamin was the first record to be released under label Farmer & The Owl, a co-operation between Wollongong-based music operator Yours & Owls and Music Farmers, a record store from the region.

 Release 
The EP was released on 27 June 2014. It was met with critical acclaim, and got the attention of Lio Cerezo, founder of Canine Records, whom with the band later signed a deal with.

Track listing
All tracks written by Zach Stephenson and William Fleming.

Personnel
Adapted from the album's liner notes.

 Musicians Hockey Dad Zach Stephenson – guitar, lead vocals
 William Fleming – drumsAdditional performers'
 Stephen Bourke – bass

Technical 

 Tom Iansek – producer, mixer
 Rick O'Neil – mastering
 Brett Randall – art direction

References

2014 debut EPs
Hockey Dad albums
Kanine Records EPs